Calidota strigosa, the streaked calidota moth, is a moth of the family Erebidae. It was described by Francis Walker in 1855. It is found on the Antilles and from the southern United States (from Florida to Arizona) to Central America.

The wingspan is about 54 mm.

The larvae feed on Guettarda elliptica.

References

Phaegopterina
Moths described in 1855